William Mauldin "Bo" Hopkins (February 2, 1938May 28, 2022) was an American actor. He was known for playing supporting roles in several major studio films between 1969 and 1979 and appeared in many television shows and TV movies.

Career  

Hopkins appeared in more than 100 film and television roles in a career of more than 40 years, including the major studio films The Wild Bunch (1969), The Bridge at Remagen (1969), The Getaway (1972), American Graffiti (1973), The Man Who Loved Cat Dancing (1973), The Killer Elite (1975), Posse (1975), A Small Town in Texas (1976), Midnight Express (1978), and More American Graffiti (1979).  His final film, Hillbilly Elegy, was directed by his long-time friend Ron Howard and released in 2020.

After Hopkins' first roles in major films in the early 1970s he appeared in White Lightning (1973). Hopkins played Roy Boone. Jerry Reed and Hopkins played brothers Joe Hawkins and Tom Hawkins in the 1985 film What Comes Around.

Hopkins starred or co-starred in many made-for-television movies of the mid-1970s, including Gondola (1973), Judgment: The Court Martial of Lieutenant William Calley (1975), The Runaway Barge (1975), The Kansas City Massacre (1975), The Invasion of Johnson County (1976), Dawn: Portrait of a Teenage Runaway (1976), Woman on the Run (1977), Thaddeus Rose and Eddie (1978), Crisis in Sun Valley (1978), and The Busters (1978).

When Gretchen Corbett left the television series The Rockford Files in 1978, Hopkins replaced her character as Rockford's attorney John Cooper, ultimately appearing in three episodes. In 1981, Hopkins appeared in the first season of the prime time drama Dynasty as Matthew Blaisdel. His many other appearances on television included in miniseries Aspen (1977) and Beggarman, Thief (1979), and in episodes of Gunsmoke, Bonanza, The Virginian, Nichols, The Rat Patrol (replacing Justin Tarr as the jeep driver for three episodes), The Mod Squad, Hawaii Five-O, Paul Sand in Friends and Lovers, The Rookies, Charlie's Angels, Fantasy Island, The A-Team, Scarecrow and Mrs. King, The Fall Guy, Crazy Like a Fox, Murder, She Wrote, and Doc Elliot. Hopkins portrayed a role in the video game Nuclear Strike. He plays Colonel LeMonde, a mercenary who steals a nuclear weapon. The "Strike" team tracks him through Southeast Asia.

Personal life  

William Hopkins was born in Greenville, South Carolina. At the age of nine months, he was adopted by a couple who were unable to conceive. Growing up, he was called "Billy." His adoptive father worked in a mill in Taylors, South Carolina. When his father was 39, he died of a heart attack on the porch of the family's home. Billy and his mother witnessed his death. Unable to remain in their house, a month later the two of them moved to a new residence in nearby Ware Shoals, where his grandfather and uncles worked in another mill. His mother eventually remarried a man whose last name was Davis. Hopkins did not get along with his new stepfather; the two got into numerous arguments, some serious. After running away from home a few times, he was sent to live with his grandparents, and while there he learned that he had been adopted because his adoptive mother could not bear children. At age 12, he met his birth mother who lived with his half-sisters and a half-brother in Lockhart, another small mill town in South Carolina.

Billy led a troubled life as a youngster, with numerous instances of truancy, minor crimes, and a stay in a reform school. He dropped out of school just before his 17th birthday and joined the United States Army, where he was assigned to the 101st Airborne Division. He was based at Fort Jackson, Fort Gordon, and Fort Pope, before being shipped off to Korea, where he served for nine months. After his military service, William "Billy" Hopkins began dating Norma Woodle, whom he married at age 21, and they had a daughter in July 1960.

Hopkins became interested in pursuing an acting career, although his wife disapproved of it and she soon left him, taking their daughter with her. After appearing in some area plays, he received a scholarship to study acting and stage production at the Pioneer Playhouse in Kentucky, where he soon moved. While there, he began dating a girl who had once held the title of Miss Mississippi. From Kentucky, he made his way to New York City to act in more stage plays. After New York, he moved to Hollywood with his cousin's boyfriend, who wanted to be a stuntman. In Hollywood, he earned a living parking cars while studying at the Actors Studio, where one of his classmates was future Oscar-winner Martin Landau.

Explaining in a 2012 magazine interview how he got his first name "Bo," he said: 

Hopkins was married to Sian Eleanor Green from 1989 until his death; they had a son in 1995. After six years of professional inactivity, Hopkins returned to acting, reading scripts, and was writing his autobiography.

Death 
Hopkins died on May 28, 2022, after suffering a heart attack. He was 84 years old.

Filmography

Film

Television

References

Further reading

External links 
 

1938 births
2022 deaths
20th-century American male actors
21st-century American male actors
Actors from Greenville, South Carolina
American adoptees
American male film actors
American male television actors
American male voice actors
Male actors from South Carolina
United States Army soldiers